

Clubs

Results

League table

References

D